A beehive shelf is a piece of laboratory equipment, usually of pottery, used to support a receiving jar or tube while a gas is being collected over water with a pneumatic trough. It is used so that when the gas emerges from the delivery tube into the beehive shelf, it is funneled into the receiving jar instead of being released elsewhere.

History

The name derives from the design of early beehives made from bound grass called a skep. The squat circular shape was made by binding the grass bundles to form a flat wheel. Sides were added using the same material with a cutout to allow honey bees to enter and leave the hive.

See also

Pneumatic chemistry

Further reading

 Griffin, John Joseph, Chemical Handicraft: A Classified and Descriptive Catalogue of Chemical Apparatus, page 226, 1877

Laboratory equipment